František Kolenatý (29 January 1900 – 24 February 1956) was a Czechoslovak footballer. He played 28 games and scored one goal for the Czechoslovakia national football team. Kolenatý represented Czechoslovakia at the 1920 Olympics and 1924 Olympics.

References

1900 births
1956 deaths
Czech footballers
Czechoslovak footballers
Czechoslovakia international footballers
AC Sparta Prague players
Bohemians 1905 players
Olympic footballers of Czechoslovakia
Footballers at the 1920 Summer Olympics
Footballers at the 1924 Summer Olympics
Association football midfielders
Footballers from Prague
People from the Kingdom of Bohemia